1-Hydroxy-2,2,6,6-tetramethylpiperidine is the organic compound with the formula C5H6Me4NOH (Me = CH3).  A white solid, it is classified as a hydroxylamine.  The compound has attracted interest as the reduced derivative of the popular radical 2,2,6,6-tetramethylpiperidin-1-yl)oxyl ("TEMPO").  It is a mild base.

References

Piperidines
Hydroxylamines